Hellraiser is a 1987 British horror film.

Hellraiser or Hell Raiser may also refer to:

Hellraiser (franchise), comprising the 1987 film, its sequels, print media, and merchandise

Music
Hellraiser Series, a line of guitars manufactured by Schecter Guitar Research
Hellraiser (album) or the title song, by Krokus, 2006
Hellraiser: Best of the Epic Years, an album by Motörhead, 2003
"Hellraiser" (Ozzy Osbourne and Motörhead song), a song written by Ozzy Osbourne, Zakk Wylde, and Lemmy; recorded by Osbourne (1991) and Motörhead (1992)
"Hellraiser" (The Beatnuts song), 1994
"Hellraiser", a song by Entombed from Hollowman, 1993
"Hell Raiser", a song by Suicide Commando from Mindstrip, 2000
"Hell Raiser", a song by Sweet from The Sweet, 1973

Professional wrestling
The Hell Raisers, a 1992–1995 incarnation of The Road Warriors, a tag team
Jerry Tuite (1966–2003), nicknamed Hell Raiser, American professional wrestler

See also
Hellblazer, a horror comic book series that was originally to have been called Hellraiser